Crillon is a commune in the Oise department in northern France.

See also 
 Communes of the Oise department

References 

Communes of Oise